One Arrow 95 is an Indian reserve of the One Arrow First Nation in Saskatchewan. It is 53 kilometres southwest of Prince Albert. In the 2016 Canadian Census, it recorded a population of 680 living in 163 of its 168 total private dwellings. In the same year, its Community Well-Being index was calculated at 49 of 100, compared to 58.4 for the average First Nations community and 77.5 for the average non-Indigenous community.

References

Indian reserves in Saskatchewan
Division No. 15, Saskatchewan